Majed Al-Taqi (born 9 March 1970) is a Kuwaiti diver. He competed at the 1984 Summer Olympics and the 1988 Summer Olympics.

References

External links
 

1970 births
Living people
Kuwaiti male divers
Olympic divers of Kuwait
Divers at the 1984 Summer Olympics
Divers at the 1988 Summer Olympics
Place of birth missing (living people)